Joe Biden assumed office as President of the United States on January 20, 2021. The president has the authority to nominate members of his Cabinet to the United States Senate for confirmation under the Appointments Clause of the United States Constitution.

Before confirmation and during congressional hearings, a high-level career member of an executive department heads this pre-confirmed cabinet on an acting basis. The Cabinet's creation was part of the transition of power following the 2020 United States presidential election.

In addition to the 15 heads of executive departments, there are nine Cabinet-level officials. Biden altered his cabinet structure, elevating the chair of the Council of Economic Advisers, director of the Office of Science and Technology Policy and ambassador to the United Nations as Cabinet-level positions. Biden removed the director of the Central Intelligence Agency from his Cabinet.

Confirmations had occurred at the slowest pace of any presidential cabinet in modern history that resulted from delays in facilitating an orderly transition of power and passing the organizing resolution for governing an evenly split Senate following the 2020–2021 United States Senate run-off elections in Georgia; and the second impeachment of Donald Trump. By March 2021, a pick-up in the first half of the month brought confirmations close to pace. Biden is the first president since Ronald Reagan in 1981 to have all of his original Cabinet secretary nominees confirmed to their posts.

This page documents the confirmation process for Cabinet nominees of Joe Biden's administration. They are listed according to the United States order of precedence.

Cabinet
All permanent members of the Cabinet of the United States as heads of executive departments require the advice and consent of the United States Senate following appointment by the president before taking office. The vice presidency is exceptional in that the position requires an election to office pursuant to the United States Constitution. The president may also designate heads of other agencies and non-Senate-confirmed members of the Executive Office of the President as Cabinet-level members of the Cabinet. The Cabinet meets with the president in the Cabinet Room, a room adjacent to the Oval Office.

The following have been named as Cabinet appointees by the president of the United States.

Confirmation process
Below is a list of confirmations for Cabinet positions, Cabinet-level positions, and other significant positions that were approved through the Senate from January 2021 onwards, by a recorded roll-call vote, rather than by a voice vote.

Confirmation votes

Committee process

Notes

Elected officials

President
On November 7, 2020, it was announced that Democrat Joe Biden defeated the incumbent president, Donald Trump, in the 2020 presidential election. Joe Biden received 306 electoral votes compared to Trump's 232 electoral votes, with 270 needed to win the presidency. He assumed office on January 20, 2021.

Vice President

Senator Kamala Harris (D-CA) was elected vice president of the United States, receiving 306 electoral votes, compared to the incumbent vice president, Mike Pence, who received 232 electoral votes. An elected vice president does not require Senate confirmation, and the vice president does not serve at the president's pleasure.

Having assumed office on January 20, 2021, she is the first female vice president of the United States as well as the first African American and Asian American to hold the second-highest office.

Nominated candidates for Cabinet positions
The following cabinet positions are listed in order of their creation (also used as the basis for the United States presidential line of succession).

Secretary of State
A nomination for Secretary of State is reviewed during hearings held by the members of the Foreign Relations Committee, then presented to the full Senate for a vote.
 Foreign Relations Committee hearing held on January 19, 2021, and approved 15–3 on January 25, 2021. Confirmed 78–22 and sworn in on January 26, 2021.

Secretary of the Treasury
A nomination for Secretary of the Treasury is reviewed during hearings held by the members of the Finance Committee, then presented to the full Senate for a vote.
 Finance Committee hearing held on January 19, 2021, and approved by unanimous consent on January 22, 2021. Confirmed 84–15 on January 25, 2021, and sworn in on January 26, 2021.

Secretary of Defense
A nomination for Secretary of Defense is reviewed during hearings held by the members of the Armed Services Committee, then presented to the full Senate for a vote. Biden's announced nominee, retired Gen. Lloyd Austin, required a congressional waiver to be granted under the National Security Act of 1947 before he was confirmed.

Waiver process:
 House Armed Services Committee closed-door briefing held and approved without objection on January 21, 2021. Floor vote passed 326–78 on January 21, 2021.
 Senate Armed Services Committee hearing held and approved by voice vote on January 21, 2021. Floor vote passed 69–27 on January 21, 2021.
 Signed into law on January 22, 2021.
Confirmation process:
 Armed Services Committee hearing held on January 19, 2021, and approved by unanimous consent on January 21, 2021. Confirmed 93–2 and sworn in on January 22, 2021.

Attorney General
A nomination for Attorney General is reviewed during hearings held by the members of the Judiciary Committee, then presented to the full Senate for a vote.
 Judiciary Committee hearings held on February 22–23, 2021, and approved 15–7 on March 1, 2021. Cloture invoked 70–29 on March 9, 2021. Confirmed 70–30 on March 10, 2021, and sworn in on March 11, 2021.

Secretary of the Interior
A nomination for Secretary of the Interior is reviewed during hearings held by the members of the Energy and Natural Resources Committee, then presented to the full Senate for a vote. Biden reportedly offered the position to Governor Michelle Lujan Grisham of New Mexico, but she turned it down.
 Energy and Natural Resources Committee hearing held on February 23, 2021, and approved 11–9 on March 4, 2021. Cloture invoked 54–42 on March 11, 2021. Confirmed 51–40 on March 15, 2021, and sworn in on March 16, 2021.

Secretary of Agriculture
A nomination for Secretary of Agriculture is reviewed during hearings held by the members of the Agriculture, Nutrition, and Forestry Committee, then presented to the full Senate for a vote.
 Agriculture, Nutrition and Forestry Committee hearing held and approved by unanimous consent on February 2, 2021. Confirmed 92–7 on February 23, 2021, and sworn in on February 24, 2021.

Secretary of Commerce
A nomination for Secretary of Commerce is reviewed during hearings held by the members of the Commerce, Science, and Transportation Committee, then presented to the full Senate for a vote.
 Commerce, Science and Transportation Committee hearing held on January 26, 2021, and approved 21–3 on February 3, 2021. Cloture invoked 84–15 on March 1, 2021. Confirmed 84–15 on March 2, 2021, and sworn in on March 3, 2021.

Secretary of Labor
A nomination for Secretary of Labor is reviewed during hearings held by the members of the Health, Education, Labor, and Pensions Committee, then presented to the full Senate for a vote.

Marty Walsh 
 Health, Education, Labor and Pensions Committee hearing held on February 4, 2021, and approved 18–4 on February 11, 2021. Cloture invoked 68–30 on March 18, 2021, and confirmed 68–29 on March 22, 2021. Sworn in on March 23, 2021.

Julie Su 
On February 7, 2023, it was reported that Walsh would be resigning in the coming days in order to become President of the National Hockey League Players' Association. Walsh will be the second member of the presidential cabinet to resign, after Eric Lander, who resigned as Director of the Office of Science and Technology Policy in early 2022. After pressure from the Congressional Asian Pacific American Caucus, Biden nominated Deputy Secretary Julie Su to the position.

Secretary of Health and Human Services
Although historically the nominee also holds meetings with the Health, Education, Labor, and Pensions Committee, officially a nomination for Secretary of Health and Human Services is reviewed during hearings held by the members of the United States Senate Committee on Finance, then presented to the full Senate for a vote.
 Health, Education, Labor and Pensions Committee consultative hearing held on February 23, 2021.
 Finance Committee hearing held on February 24, 2021, and tied 14–14 on March 3, 2021. Motion to discharge to the floor passed 51–48 on March 11, 2021. Cloture invoked 50–49 on March 17, 2021. Confirmed 50–49 on March 18, 2021, and sworn in on March 19, 2021.

Secretary of Housing and Urban Development
A nomination for Secretary of Housing and Urban Development is reviewed during hearings held by the members of the Banking, Housing, and Urban Affairs Committee, then presented to the full Senate for a vote.
 Banking, Housing and Urban Affairs Committee hearing held on January 28, 2021, and approved 17–7 on February 4, 2021. Cloture invoked 69–30 on March 9, 2021. Confirmed 66–34 and sworn in on March 10, 2021.

Secretary of Transportation
A nomination for Secretary of Transportation is reviewed during hearings held by the members of the Commerce, Science, and Transportation Committee, then presented to the full Senate for a vote.
 Commerce, Science and Transportation Committee hearing held on January 21, 2021, and approved 21–3 on January 27, 2021. Confirmed 86–13 on February 2, 2021, and sworn in on February 3, 2021.

Secretary of Energy
The nomination of a secretary-designate is reviewed during hearings held by the members of the Energy and Natural Resources Committee, then presented to the full Senate for a vote.
 Energy and Natural Resources Committee hearing held on January 27, 2021, and approved 13–4 on February 3, 2021. Cloture invoked 67–32 on February 24, 2021. Confirmed 64–35 and sworn in on February 25, 2021.

Secretary of Education
A nomination for Secretary of Education is reviewed during hearings held by the members of the Health, Education, Labor, and Pensions Committee, then presented to the full Senate for a vote.
 Health, Education, Labor and Pensions Committee hearing held on February 3, 2021, and approved 17–5 on February 11, 2021. Cloture invoked 66–32 on February 25, 2021. Confirmed 64–33 on March 1, 2021, and sworn in on March 2, 2021.

Secretary of Veterans Affairs
A nomination for Secretary of Veterans Affairs is reviewed during hearings held by the members of the Veterans' Affairs Committee, then presented to the full Senate for a vote.
 Veterans' Affairs Committee hearing held on January 27, 2021, and approved by unanimous consent on February 2, 2021. Confirmed 87–7 on February 8, 2021, and sworn in on February 9, 2021.

Secretary of Homeland Security
A nomination for Secretary of Homeland Security is reviewed during hearings held by the members of the Homeland Security and Governmental Affairs Committee, then presented to the full Senate for a vote.
 Homeland Security and Governmental Affairs Committee hearing held on January 19, 2021, and approved 7–4 on January 26, 2021. Cloture invoked 55–42 on January 28, 2021. Confirmed 56–43 and sworn in on February 2, 2021.

Nominated candidates for Cabinet-level positions
Cabinet-level officials have positions that are considered to be of Cabinet level, but which are not heads of the executive departments. Which exact positions that are considered to be cabinet-level varies with each president. Biden has announced he will elevate three positions to Cabinet-level, while removing the director of the Central Intelligence Agency.

Administrator of the Environmental Protection Agency
 Environment and Public Works Committee hearing held on February 3, 2021, and approved 14–6 on February 9, 2021. Cloture invoked 65–35 and confirmed 66–34 on March 10, 2021. Sworn in on March 11, 2021.

Director of the Office of Management and Budget

Neera Tanden
 Homeland Security and Governmental Affairs Committee hearing held on February 9, 2021. Committee vote cancelled on February 24, 2021.
 Budget Committee hearing held on February 10, 2021. Committee vote cancelled on February 24, 2021.
 Nomination withdrawal announced on March 2, 2021, and officially submitted to the Senate on March 25, 2021.

Shalanda Young
 Homeland Security and Governmental Affairs Committee hearing held on February 1, 2022, and approved 8–6 on February 9, 2022.
 Budget Committee hearing held on February 1, 2022, and approved 15–6 on February 9, 2022.
 Cloture invoked 53–31 on March 14, 2022 and confirmed 61–36 on March 15, 2022. Sworn in on March 17, 2022.

Director of National Intelligence
 Intelligence Committee hearing held on January 19, 2021, and approved by unanimous consent on January 20, 2021. Confirmed 84–10 on January 20, 2021, and sworn in on January 21, 2021.

Trade Representative
The U.S. trade representative has been a Cabinet-level member since 1974, the beginning of Gerald Ford's presidency.
 Finance Committee hearing held on February 25, 2021, and approved by unanimous consent on March 3, 2021. Cloture invoked 98–0 on March 16, 2021. Confirmed 98–0 on March 17, 2021, and sworn in on March 18, 2021.

Ambassador to the United Nations
The UN ambassador was previously in the Cabinet from 1953 to 1989, 1993 to 2001, and 2009 to 2018.
 Foreign Relations Committee hearing held on January 27, 2021, and approved 18–4 on February 4, 2021. Cloture invoked 75–20 on February 22, 2021. Confirmed 78–20 on February 23, 2021, and assumed office after presenting credentials on February 25, 2021.

Chair of the Council of Economic Advisers
This position was previously in the Cabinet from 2009 to 2017.

Cecilia Rouse
 Banking, Housing and Urban Affairs Committee hearing held January 28, 2021, and approved by unanimous consent on February 4, 2021. Cloture invoked 94–5 and confirmed 95–4 on March 2, 2021. Sworn in on March 12, 2021.

Jared Bernstein

Administrator of the Small Business Administration
 Small Business and Entrepreneurship Committee hearing held on February 3, 2021, and approved 15–5 on February 24, 2021. Cloture invoked 80–18 and confirmed 81–17 on March 16, 2021. Sworn in on March 17, 2021.

Director of the Office of Science and Technology Policy and Science Advisor to the President
Biden elevated this position to the Cabinet for the first time, emphasizing the importance of science in the administration.

His staff role as Science Advisor to the President does not require Senate confirmation, and he began the role on January 25, 2021.

Eric Lander
 Commerce, Science and Transportation Committee hearing held on April 29, 2021, and approved 22–6 on May 20, 2021. Confirmed by voice vote on May 28, 2021. Sworn in on June 2, 2021.
 Announced resignation on February 7, 2022, effective February 18, 2022.

Arati Prabhakar
 Commerce, Science and Transportation Committee hearing held on July 20, 2022, and approved 15–13 on July 27, 2022. Cloture invoked 58–38 on September 21, 2022. Confirmed 56–40 on September 22, 2022, and sworn in on October 3, 2022.

White House Chief of Staff
The White House chief of staff has traditionally been the highest-ranking staff employee of the White House. The responsibilities of the chief of staff are both managerial and advisory over the president's official business. The chief of staff is appointed by and serves at the pleasure of the president; it does not require Senate confirmation. The first Cabinet or Cabinet-level position appointee announced by Biden was White House chief of staff Ron Klain. He stepped down in February 2023, and was succeeded by Jeff Zients.

See also
 Inauguration of Joe Biden
 List of political appointments by Joe Biden
 Presidential transition of Joe Biden

Notes

References

External links

 Axios: Biden Cabinet tracker
 Chicago Tribune: Biden Cabinet picks: Running list of the President's nominees
 New York magazine Intelligencer: All of President Joe Biden's Cabinet nominees

 
Biden, Joe
Cabinets established in 2021
Cabinet